Mohelnice is a town in Šumperk District in the Olomouc Region of the Czech Republic. It has about 9,100 inhabitants. The historic town centre is well preserved and is protected by law as an urban monument zone.

Administrative parts
Villages of Křemačov, Květín, Libivá, Podolí, Řepová, Studená Loučka and Újezd are administrative parts of Mohelnice. Studená Loučka forms an exclave of the municipal territory.

Geography
The eastern part of the municipal territory of Mohelnice lies in the Mohelnice Depression lowland, which is named after the town. The western part is located in the Zábřeh Highlands.

In the eastern part are located two artificial lakes created by flooding sandstone quarries, Mohelnické and Moravičanské. The easternmost part of Mohelnice with Moravičanské Lake is situated in the Litovelské Pomoraví Protected Landscape Area. The Mírovka Creek flows through the town into the Morava River, which forms the eastern municipal border.

History

The first written mention of Mohelnice is in a deed of bishop Jindřich Zdík from 1141, when it was owned by the Olomouc bishopric. In 1273, Mohelnice was first referred to as a town.

In 1307 and 1312 the town was devastated by plague. In 1424 it was conquered by the Hussites, and 700 people died. During the first half of the 16th century the town was rebuilt and the town fortifications were built. The Thirty Years' War devastated Mohelnice – in 1623 it was plundered by Swedish troops and over 30% of the inhabitants died of the plague. The Sweden looted the town again in 1642, 1643, 1644 and 1647. In 1662 half of the town was destroyed by fire. 1685 saw the notorious witch trials during which a local vicar Alois Lautner was burned at the stake.

The town's textile industry began operating in 1713, and in 1714 the town suffered another plague. There was another significant fire in 1739, which destroyed more than half of the town. During the Silesian Wars the town was plundered several times. In 1772 Mohelnice had 1,867 inhabitants, in 1792 it was 3,887. There were cholera epidemics in 1832, 1849, 1851 and 1866. The town suffered from fire in 1841 and few smaller fires later. In 1863 Mohelnice built its first sanitation system.

In the 19th and 20th century the town was industrialised and various factories were established. In 1910 most of the old town walls were demolished.

The town had a German-speaking majority population who comprised around 95% of the population before World War II. In 1938 the town was occupied by Nazi Germany as part of Sudetenland. After the war the German population was expelled. This caused the town to become almost deserted. Within a few months, however, the town was repopulated by families from other parts of Czechoslovakia.

In the second half of the 20th century the town went through major urban changes, including the narrowing of the Mírovka Creek.

Demographics

Economy
Mohelnice is predominantly industrial town with significant electrotechnical, engineering and construction industries. There is an industrial zone on the eastern outskirts of the town. The largest employers based in the town are Hella Autotechnik Nova, manufacturer of lighting for the automotive industry, and Montix a.s., manufacturer of plastic parts, especially for the automotive industry.

Culture
From 1975, Mohelnice was known for the folk and country music festival Mohelnický dostavník. The tradition ended in 2020.

Sights

The historic centre consists of the historic floor plan of the town with a central square and annular streets. The Svobody Square is partially lined by two-storey burgher houses. Remains of the walls and the northern entrance gate from 1540 have been preserved from the town fortifications.

The second important area is the Kostelní Square with the parish Church of Saint Thomas of Canterbury. The original church on this site was first mentioned in 1247. This church was expanded in the 14th century, and rebuilt in the 15th century after it was burned down. Gothic, Renaissance and Baroque style intertwines in its construction. The last modifications were in the Neo-Gothic style. It has a rich baroque interior decoration. The church tower is the landmark of the town.

The Church of St. Stanislaus was built in 1584. It was baroque reconstructed in the 17th and 18th centuries.

The Bishop's Castle on the Kostelní Square is one of the oldest preserved buildings in whole region. It was built in the 13th century at the latest. Today, there is a regional museum.

Notable people
Antonín Brus z Mohelnice (1518–1580), Archbishop of Prague
Antal Stašek (1843–1931), writer; worked here in 1913–1914
Edmund Reitter (1845–1920), Austrian entomologist, writer and collector
Karl Penka (1847–1912), Austrian philologist and anthropologist
Max Bernhauer (1866–1946), Austrian entomologist
Richard Schmitz (1885–1954), mayor of Vienna in 1934–1938
Martin Horák (born 1980), footballer

Twin towns – sister cities

Mohelnice is twinned with:
 Radlin, Poland

References

External links

Cities and towns in the Czech Republic
Populated places in Šumperk District